2005 October Bangladesh court bombing was a synchronized bombing that happen on 3 October 2005 that targets courts in Chandpur and Lakshmipur and resulted in 2 deaths and 34 injuries. It was carried out by Jamaat-ul-Mujahideen Bangladesh, an Islamist terrorist organisation, that opposed secular judiciary and legal system in Bangladesh.

Attacks

Chandpur
One person was killed in the bombing targeting Chandpur court. Two suspects were arrested from the spot. The suspects had leaflets calling for Sharia law in their possession and admitted being members of Jamaat-ul-Mujahideen Bangladesh.

Lakshmipur
One person was killed and six injured in the attack of Lakshmipur. Judge Abu Sufian was the target of the attack. The bomb was hidden inside a legal book. The judge escaped unhurt

Chittagong
On 3 October 2005, terrorists snuck in a bomb at the court of Additional District Judge of chittagong. They hurled the bomb targeting judge Dilzar Hossain and magistrate Akram Hossain. The bombs failed to detonate and no one was injured. Lawyers and Police personal present in the court were able to capture the two terrorists, Abdul Malek Laltu and Shahadat Ali.

Trial
A Chittagong court sentenced 3 Jamaat-ul-Mujahideen Bangladesh militants to 14 years imprisonment including bombmaker Zahidul Islam alias Boma Mizan on 26 September 2017. Mizan was broken out along with two other JMB militants when they was being transported to jail in 23 February 2014. Except for Boma Mizan the other two accused were in custody and present at the sentencing.

For the bombing in Lakshmipur JMB militant Masumur Rahman Masum was sentenced to death. His death was confirmed by the Bangladesh Supreme Court on 6 April 2016 and sentenced Amjad Ali to the life imprisonment on 12 April 2016.

References

2005 murders in Bangladesh
History of Bangladesh (1971–present)
Terrorist incidents in Bangladesh in 2005
Terrorist incidents in Bangladesh
Islamic terrorist incidents in 2005
Suicide bombing
Terrorism in Bangladesh
October 2005 events in Bangladesh
History of Noakhali
Lakshmipur District
Chandpur District